Hypolepis parallelogramma is a species of fern native to the foothills of the Andes.

The rachis, like the top of the stipe, is light brown to straw-colored. The blades are oblong in shape and tripinnate, the pinnulets at the base being lobed (tripinnate-pinnatifid). Scattered tiny hairs are present on the underside (only) of the costae, costules, and some veins. Sori are at the edge of the leaf with straw-colored pseudoindusia. It most closely resembles H. melanochlaena, H. repens, and H. scandens, all of which are also large with thorny stems.

The species was originally described by Gustav Kunze in 1834 as Cheilanthes parallelogramma. Presl transferred it to the genus Hypolepis in 1836. Schwartzburd and Prado designated a Peruvian collection by Poeppig made in 1829 as the lectotype in 2016.

Notes and references

References

Works cited

Dennstaedtiaceae
Flora of western South America
Flora of Bolivia
Flora of Colombia
Flora of Venezuela
Ferns of the Americas
Plants described in 1834
Taxa named by Carl Borivoj Presl